Big Thing is the fifth studio album by English new wave band Duran Duran. It was released on 18 October 1988 by EMI Records. The album reached number 15 on the UK Albums Chart and number 24 on the US Billboard 200.

A CD reissue (with one bonus track) was released in 1994. The album was reissued as a three-disc box set on 27 September 2010.

Background
In 1988, the musical climate was changing, veering to a more dance-based groove. Duran Duran were known primarily as an early 1980s new wave and synth-pop act, and the band was sitting at a career crossroads; Big Thing was their stab at maintaining mainstream popularity.

Turning to more synth- and bass-heavy grooves than their previous efforts, Big Thing was seen by many as the band's "house music" album. Tracks like the first single "I Don't Want Your Love", the title track, and the album's second single "All She Wants Is" cemented the band's more aggressive dance angle.

To get the new music played without preconceived 'teeny bopper band' notions of Duran Duran, the band sent an edited three-minute version of album tracks "The Edge of America" and "Lake Shore Driving" to radio stations, known as "Official Bootleg: The LSD Edit". The promo was credited to "The Krush Brothers", which the band also used in a few surprise live dates.

Dance music and stylistic respellings aside, Big Thing was an album of contrasts. While the general feel was a response to the burgeoning house music and rave scene, a number of tracks on the album harkened back to the band's more lush arrangements. Tracks like "Land", "Palomino" and the single "Do You Believe in Shame?" had more in common with "Save a Prayer" or "The Seventh Stranger" than with Chicago house.

The album also contains two short pieces entitled "Interlude One" and "Flute Interlude" which were more experimental in nature than anything the band had done before. The band would repeat the use of these "interludes" on future albums with "Shotgun" appearing on Duran Duran (1993), "Fragment" and "Kiss Goodbye" on Pop Trash (2000), and "Return to Now" and "A Diamond in the Mind" on All You Need Is Now (2011).

While the album and the first two singles did quite well in the charts, the relative failure of the third single "Do You Believe in Shame?" (it reached No. 30 in the UK) killed off any chance for a fourth single from the album. A house version of "Drug" which had been recorded with producer Marshall Jefferson in April 1989 was tentatively slated as that single.

A brief legal challenge surrounded the close resemblance of the melody of "Shame" to that of the Dale Hawkins classic "Suzie Q" (more famously covered by Creedence Clearwater Revival). It was judged that there was no intentional plagiarism in this case.

The album was eventually reissued with the original Daniel Abraham mix of "Drug" added as a bonus track, previously released as a B-side to the "Do You Believe in Shame?" single.

Warren Cuccurullo
Guitarist Warren Cuccurullo had begun working with Duran Duran in the middle of the recording of the previous studio album Notorious (1986), after the acrimonious departure of former guitarist Andy Taylor. While he was still not a full band member, nor a true songwriting partner, Big Thing was the first full album with which Cuccurullo was involved. His contributions can be felt 6 tracks of the record including a crazed guitar solo on album closer "Lake Shore Driving".

Contrary to popular belief, Chester Kamen plays guitar on "I Don't Want Your Love" (although it is Cuccurullo who appears in the video).

At the end of the global Electric Theatre Tour promoting Big Thing in 1989, Warren Cuccurullo became a full-time member of the band along with drummer Sterling Campbell. Campbell would stay for one more studio album, 1990's Liberty, while Cuccurullo would remain with the band until 2001.

Dedication
For the first time in their career the band members decided to write personal dedication notes on the album sleeve thus thanking Alex Sadkin who had been killed in a car crash in late 1987, Andy Warhol, who had died in early 1987 and David Miles, a childhood friend of Le Bon's who died of an illegal drug cigarette during the album's creation.

Singles
 "I Don't Want Your Love" (September 1988) #14 UK, #4 US
 "All She Wants Is" (December 1988) #9 UK, #22 US
 "Do You Believe in Shame?" (April 1989) #30 UK, #72 US

Promotional singles
 "Official Bootleg: LSD Edit" (as The Krush Brothers)
 "Big Thing" (UK and Mexico only)
 "Too Late Marlene" (Brazil only)

Track listing

1988 original release
All songs written and arranged by Duran Duran.

As neither of the UK CDs show the track listings the difference between them can be identified by the catalogue numbers. These are:-
 0777 7 909582 7 (UK: CDDDB 33) Original 12 track CD
 0777 7 898342 2 (UK: CDPRG 1007) 1994 reissue with bonus track

2010 reissue

 "Drug" as included here is actually the "Daniel Abraham Mix" included on previous releases, which is how the song was originally meant to be included on the album. The version which appeared on the original album, remixed by Joe Dworniak and Duncan Bridgeman, is included on disc two, labelled "Remix".

 Tracks 3, 9 and 12 are previously unreleased. The remixes of the song Big Thing have no credit. But is rumored that were made by Steve Peck.

Japanese bonus disc
Toshiba EMI also released Big Thing in a two-disc set, which featured not only the complete album, but a five-song live CD, Previously released as Duran Goes Dutch (US promo EP, 1987):

 "Notorious" (Live)
 "Vertigo (Do the Demolition)" (Live)
 "New Religion" (Live)
 "Hungry Like the Wolf" (Live)
 "American Science" (Live)

Personnel
Duran Duran
 Simon Le Bon – lead vocals
 Nick Rhodes – keyboards
 John Taylor – bass guitars

Additional musicians
 Warren Cuccurullo – guitars (tracks: 1, 4, 6, 9, 11, 12)
 Steve Ferrone – drums (tracks: 1, 2, 4, 6, 9)
 Chester Kamen – guitars (tracks: 2, 3)
 Sterling Campbell – drums (tracks 3, 5, 7, 12)

Also credited
 Jonathan Elias – co-producer
 Daniel Abraham – co-producer and mixer
 Ted Jensen – mastering

Charts

Weekly charts

Year-end charts

Certifications

References

External links
 
 1988: The Duran Duran Timeline

1988 albums
Albums produced by Daniel Abraham (record producer)
Albums produced by Jonathan Elias
Duran Duran albums
EMI Records albums